Paul Rotha (3 June 1907 – 7 March 1984) was a British documentary film-maker, film historian and critic.

Early life and education
He was born Paul Thompson in London, and educated at Highgate School and at the Slade School of Fine Art.

Career
Rotha was a close collaborator of John Grierson, and Wolfgang Suschitzky was one of his cinematographers. He directed and produced dozens of documentaries including Contact (1933), Air Outpost (1937) The Face of Britain (1935), World of Plenty (1943), Land of Promise (1947), A City Speaks (1947) and many others. The World Is Rich (1947) and Cradle of Genius (1961), both of which were nominated for an Academy Award, and feature films including the BAFTA-nominated No Resting Place. Rotha was Head of BBC TV's Documentaries Department between May 1953 and May 1955.

Rotha shared with Otto Neurath an interest in the techniques of visual communication, and the two men worked together on several films, where Neurath's ISOTYPE pictorial statistics were animated as an important component of the films' arguments. He was a major opponent of sound in movies.

Rotha wrote, produced and directed the 1958 crime drama Cat & Mouse, based on a novel by John Creasey and starring Lee Patterson and Ann Sears.

Personal life
Rotha married Irish actress Constance Smith in 1974.  Smith had twice (1961 and 1968) been charged with attacking Rotha and stabbing him.

Rotha died on 7 March 1984 in Wallingford, Oxfordshire.

See also
Bill Nichols
Basil Wright

References

Sources
The Film Till Now: A Survey of the Cinema (London: Jonathan Cape, 1930)
Documentary Film (London: Faber and Faber, 1935) The first major study on documentary film
The Film Till Now: A Survey of World Cinema, with an additional section by Richard Griffith, revised and enlarged edition, (London: Vision, 1949)
Portrait of a Flying Yorkshireman: Letters From Eric Knight in the United States to Paul Rotha in England, edited by Paul Rotha. Selected correspondence (London: Chapman and Hall, 1952)
Rotha on the Film; a Selection of Writings About the Cinema (Fair Lawn, New Jersey: Essential Books, 1958)
Documentary Film; the use of the film medium to interpret creatively and in social terms the life of the people as it exists in reality, by Paul Rotha in collaboration with Sinclair Road and Richard Griffith. 3d ed., rev. and enl.of Documentary Film (London: Faber and Faber, 1952;  New York: Hastings House, 1963)
Documentary Diary: An Informal History of the British Documentary Film 1928–1939 (New York: Hill and Wang, 1973)
Robert J. Flaherty: A Biography, edited by Jay Ruby (Philadelphia: University of Pennsylvania Press, 1983)
A Paul Rotha Reader, edited by Duncan Petrie and Robert Kruger (Exeter: University of Exeter Press, 1999)

External links

Bfi screenonline entry
 BFI DVD Land of Promise with several Rotha productions
 BFI DVD with The Face of Britain (1935)

Paul Rotha's papers at The University of California
Paul Rotha and Japanese documentary

1907 births
1984 deaths
English documentary filmmakers
Film directors from London
People from Wallingford, Oxfordshire
People educated at Highgate School